Nasr (in Arabic نصر) means victory in Arabic. Accordingly, many Arab sports clubs are called Nasr or Al nasr.

Nasr SC or Al Nasr SC (as well as Nasr FC or Al Nasr FC may refer to:

Al-Nasr SC (Bahrain), Bahraini sports club
Al-Nasr SC (Benghazi), Libyan football club based in Benghazi
Al Nasr SC (Cairo), Egyptian football club based in Cairo
Al-Nasr SC (Dubai), UAE football club based in Dubai
Al-Nasr SC (Iraq), Iraqi sports club based in Dhi Qar
Al-Nasr SC (Kuwait), Kuwaiti sports club based in Ardiya
Al-Nasr SC (Salalah), Omani sports club based in Salalah
Al-Nassr FC, Saudi Arabian football club based in Riyadh
Al-Nasr wal-Salam SC, Iraqi sports club based in Baghdad
NA Hussein Dey, also known as Nasr Athlétique de Hussein Dey, an Algerian sports club based in Hussein Dey
ASC Nasr de Sebkha, Mauritanean football club based in Sebkha

See also
Nasr (disambiguation)